Claudio Matthias Kammerknecht (born 7 July 1999) is a German professional footballer who plays as a defender for 3. Liga club Dynamo Dresden.

Club career
Kammerknecht is a youth academy graduate of SC Freiburg. He made his league debut for club's reserve side on 29 September 2018 in a 3–2 defeat against SV Elversberg.

On 30 May 2022, Dynamo Dresden announced the signing of Kammerknecht on a four-year deal until June 2026.

International career
In September 2022, Kammerknecht received his first call-up to the Sri Lanka national team to take part in a training camp held in Doha.

Personal life
Kammerknecht was born in Germany to a German father and a Sri Lankan mother. His father Matthias Kammerknecht is a former footballer and manager.

Career statistics

Honours
SC Freiburg II
Regionalliga Südwest: 2020–21

References

External links
 
 

1999 births
Living people
German people of Sri Lankan descent
Association football defenders
German footballers
3. Liga players
Regionalliga players
SC Freiburg II players
Dynamo Dresden players